Nazanine Hozar (born 1978) is an Iranian Canadian writer, whose debut novel Aria was published in 2019.

Born in Tehran, Hozar moved to Canada with her family in childhood following the Iranian Revolution, and grew up in Surrey, British Columbia. She wrote the novel while pursuing her MFA in creative writing at the University of British Columbia.

In 2020, Aria was shortlisted for the Amazon.ca First Novel Award and the Ethel Wilson Fiction Prize.

References

1978 births
Living people
21st-century Canadian novelists
21st-century Canadian women writers
Canadian women novelists
Iranian emigrants to Canada
University of British Columbia alumni
People from Surrey, British Columbia
People from Tehran
Writers from British Columbia